Nicolás Kicker was the defending champion but lost in the second round to Gleb Sakharov.

Laslo Đere won the title after defeating Daniel Muñoz de la Nava 7–6(7–2), 6–4 in the final.

Seeds

Draw

Finals

Top half

Bottom half

References
Main Draw
Qualifying Draw

Internazionali di Tennis Città di Perugia - Singles
2017 Singles